The gafftopsail pompano (Trachinotus rhodopus) is a species of jack in the family Carangidae. It is found in the eastern Pacific.

Distribution and habitat
Gafftopsail pompanos are found in the eastern Pacific. Their range extends from Zuma Beach in southern California to Peru and the Galapagos Islands. They are more common around the Gulf of California and Peru.

Description
It is diamond shaped with yellow fins. The colouration of this fish is silver.

Ecology

Diet
Trachinotus rhodopus feeds on invertebrates and fish.

References

External links
 

rhodopus
Fish of the Gulf of California
Fish of Mexican Pacific coast
Western Central American coastal fauna
Galápagos Islands coastal fauna
Taxa named by Theodore Gill
Trachinotus rhodopus